Ibn Abdallah Mohammed ibn al-Hussein al-Haik (born in Tétouan, Morocco) was a Moroccan poet, musician and author of a songbook (el-kunash) comprising eleven nubas, that had been handed down for generations. The songbook, written in 1789, doesn't include the musical notation of the songs and is the single most important source on the early tradition of Classical Andalusian music. It also contains the names of the authors of the poems and melodies. The book has been republished by Abdelkrim Rais in 1982.

See also
Andalusian classical music
Mohamed Bajeddoub
Abdessadeq Cheqara
Abdelkrim Rais

References
Songbook of al Haik (1789). Manuscript conserved in the library of the Daoud family in Tétouan.
 (retrieved 25 August 2008)

18th-century Moroccan poets
18th-century Moroccan writers
People from Tétouan
18th-century Moroccan people
Moroccan musicians